The 1891 Rhode Island gubernatorial election was held on April 1, 1891. Democratic incumbent John W. Davis received 48.95% of the vote and Republican nominee Herbert W. Ladd 46.19%. With no candidate attaining a majority of the vote it was decided by the Rhode Island General Assembly The Republican majority selected Ladd.

General election

Candidates
Major party candidates
Herbert W. Ladd, Republican
John W. Davis, Democratic

Other candidates
John H. Larry, Prohibition
Franklin E. Burton, Independent

Results

References

1891
Rhode Island